The North Polk Community School District is a rural public school district headquartered in Alleman, Iowa.

Almost all of the district is in Polk County, with small sections in Boone and Story counties. It includes the municipalities of Alleman, Elkhart, and Sheldahl as well as almost all of Polk City. It also includes the surrounding rural area. Alleman is located approximately halfway (five miles north of Ankeny) between Des Moines and Ames.

Schools
The district operates five schools:
 North Polk Central Elementary School, Alleman
 North Polk West Elementary School, Polk City
 North Polk Big Creek Elementary School, Polk City
 North Polk Middle School, Alleman
 North Polk High School, Alleman

North Polk High School

Athletics
 Boys - Baseball, Basketball, Cross Country, Football, Golf, Soccer, Swimming, Tennis, Track and Field, Wrestling
 Girls - Basketball, Cheerleading, Color Guard, Cross Country, Dance, Golf, Soccer, Swimming, Tennis, Track and Field, Volleyball, Winter Guard

State Championships
Baseball:  2014 - Class 2A 
Boys' Basketball:  1996 Class 2A
Softball:  4 time State Champions (1975 (Fall), 2000 (1A), 2006 (2A), 2008 (2A))
Girls' Track and Field:  2008 - Class 2A

Activities

Concert Band, Concert Choir, Jazz Band, Jazz Choir, Marching Band, Musical Production, Play Production, Speech Team, Future Farmers of America, NPHS Key Club, National Honor Society, National Spanish Honor Society, NPHS Student Council

Enrollment

See also
List of school districts in Iowa
List of high schools in Iowa

References

External links 
District website

School districts in Iowa
Education in Polk County, Iowa
Education in Boone County, Iowa
Education in Story County, Iowa